is a Japanese football player. He plays for Grulla Morioka.

Career
Hiromi Nakashima joined Japan Football League club Briobecca Urayasu in 2016. In 2017, he moved J3 League club Grulla Morioka.

Club statistics
Updated to 22 February 2018.

References

External links

Profile at Grulla Morioka

1993 births
Living people
Ryutsu Keizai University alumni
Association football people from Fukuoka Prefecture
Japanese footballers
J3 League players
Japan Football League players
Briobecca Urayasu players
Iwate Grulla Morioka players
Association football goalkeepers